The 1915 Villanova Wildcats football team represented the Villanova University during the 1915 college football season. The Wildcats team captain was Patrick Regan.

Schedule

References

Villanova
Villanova Wildcats football seasons
Villanova Wildcats football